Phyllomyza is a genus of freeloader flies in the family Milichiidae. There are at least 30 described species in Phyllomyza.

Species
These 34 species belong to the genus Phyllomyza:

 Phyllomyza aelleni Papp, 1984 c g
 Phyllomyza amamiensis Iwasa, 2003 c g
 Phyllomyza beckeri Kramer, 1920 c g
 Phyllomyza cavernae Meijere, 1914 c g
 Phyllomyza clavellata g
 Phyllomyza claviconis Yang, 1998 c g
 Phyllomyza dilatata Malloch, 1914 c g
 Phyllomyza donisthorpei Schmitz, 1923 c g
 Phyllomyza epitacta Hendel, 1914 c g
 Phyllomyza equitans (Hendel, 1919) c g
 Phyllomyza euthyipalpis g
 Phyllomyza flavipalpis Meijere, 1914 c g
 Phyllomyza flavitarsis (Meigen, 1830) c g
 Phyllomyza formicae Schmitz, 1923 c g
 Phyllomyza fuscogrisea (Seguy, 1933) c g
 Phyllomyza guangxiensis Xi, Yang & Yin, 2018
 Phyllomyza hirtipalpis Malloch, 1913 i c g
 Phyllomyza japonica Iwasa, 2003 c g
 Phyllomyza kanmiyai Iwasa, 2003 c g
 Phyllomyza longipalpis (Schmitz, 1924) c g
 Phyllomyza lucens Hendel, 1924 c g
 Phyllomyza lutea Meijere, 1914 c g
 Phyllomyza luteigenis Xi, Yang & Yin, 2018
 Phyllomyza luteipalpis Malloch, 1914 c g
 Phyllomyza melania (Hendel, 1919) c g
 Phyllomyza milnei Steyskal, 1942 i c g b
 Phyllomyza mongolica Papp, 1976 c g
 Phyllomyza nigripalpis Meijere, 1914 c g
 Phyllomyza nudipalpis Malloch, 1914 c g
 Phyllomyza pallida Meijere, 1940 c g
 Phyllomyza proceripalpis Iwasa, 2003 c g
 Phyllomyza quadratpalpus Xi, Yang & Yin, 2018
 Phyllomyza rubricornis Schmitz, 1923 c g
 Phyllomyza securicornis Fallen, 1823 i c g
 Phyllomyza silesiaca (Duda, 1935) c g
 Phyllomyza tenebrosa Brunetti, 1924 c g
 Phyllomyza tetragona Hendel, 1924 c g

Data sources: i = ITIS, c = Catalogue of Life, g = GBIF, b = Bugguide.net

References

Further reading

 

Milichiidae
Carnoidea genera
Articles created by Qbugbot